Ke Hua (19 December 1915 – 1 January 2019) was a Chinese diplomat who served as Chinese Ambassador to Guinea from 1960 to 1964, Chinese Ambassador to Ghana from 1972 to 1974, Chinese Ambassador to the Philippines from 1975 to 1978, and Chinese Ambassador to the United Kingdom from 1978 to 1983.

Biography
Ke Hua was born as Lin Dechang in Lihu Town of Puning County, Guangdong Province, on December 19, 1915. 

He entered the Yenching University in 1935, during his school days, he participated in the December 9th Movement. In April 1937, he visited Yan'an, where he got the chance to meet Mao Zedong. In November 1937, he went to Linfen, Shanxi to join the Eighth Route Army. 

After the establishment of the Communist State in 1949, he became vice-party chief of Xi'an, Shaanxi. In December 1954, he was transferred to Beijing, capital of China, where he was appointed director of the Department of Protocol of the Ministry of Foreign Affairs. In March 1960 he was appointed Chinese Ambassador to Guinea, a position he held until May 1964. Then he successively served as Chinese Ambassador to Ghana from 1972 to 1974, Chinese Ambassador to the Philippines from 1975 to 1978, and Chinese Ambassador to the United Kingdom from 1978 to 1983. Ke returned to China in 1983, and that same year he was appointed counselor of the Hong Kong and Macao Affairs Office of the State Council. He was involved in the early stage of Sino-British talks on Hong Kong's future in the early 1980s. In 1988, he became a  member of the 7th National Committee Standing committee of the Chinese People's Political Consultative Conference. He retired in 1995. On January 1, 2019, he died of illness in Beijing, aged 103.

Personal life
Ke married Zhang Ming, and the couple had three daughters. His youngest daughter, Ke Lingling, was Xi Jinping's first wife. Ke Lingling has been living in the United Kingdom since 1982.

References

External links
 Biography of Ke Hua 

1915 births
2019 deaths
Ambassadors of China to Ghana
Ambassadors of China to Guinea
Ambassadors of China to the Philippines
Ambassadors of China to the United Kingdom
Chinese Communist Party politicians from Guangdong
People's Republic of China politicians from Guangdong
Chinese centenarians
Men centenarians
Yenching University alumni
Politicians from Jieyang